William Graham (14 October 1893-1978) was an English professional footballer who played as an inside forward. He made appearances in the English Football League for Northampton Town and Wrexham.

References

1893 births
1978 deaths
English footballers
Association football forwards
English Football League players
Lancaster City F.C. players
Northampton Town F.C. players
Wrexham A.F.C. players
Great Harwood F.C. players
Burscough F.C. players
Lytham F.C. players